Iberia is a suite for piano composed between 1905 and 1909 by the Spanish composer Isaac Albéniz. It is composed of four books of three pieces each; a complete performance lasts about 90 minutes.

It is Albéniz's best-known work and considered his masterpiece.  It was highly praised by Claude Debussy and Olivier Messiaen, who said: "Iberia is the wonder for the piano; it is perhaps on the highest place among the more brilliant pieces for the king of instruments". Stylistically, this suite falls squarely in the school of Impressionism, especially in its musical evocations of Spain.

It is considered one of the most challenging works for the piano: "There is really nothing in Isaac Albeniz's Iberia that a good three-handed pianist could not master, given unlimited years of practice and permission to play at half tempo. But there are few pianists thus endowed."

Composition

Book 1
Dedicated to Ernest Chausson's wife.
 Evocación ("Evocation", A minor and A major), an impressionist reminiscence of Albéniz's native country, combining elements of the southern Spanish fandango and the northern Spanish jota song forms. It includes the rarely seen key signature of seven flats.
 El Puerto (D major), a zapateado inspired by El Puerto de Santa María, in Cádiz.
 Fête-dieu à Séville (F minor and F major) (alternative titles sometimes found: Corpus Christi; El Corpus en Sevilla), describing the Corpus Christi Day procession in Seville, during which the Corpus Christi is carried through the streets accompanied by marching bands. Musically, this piece consists of a processional march that eventually becomes overwhelmed by a mournful saeta, the melody evoking Andalusian cante jondo and the accompaniment evoking flamenco guitars. The march and saeta alternate ever more loudly until the main march theme is restated as a lively tarantella that ends abruptly with a flamboyant fffff climactic chord; the piece concludes with a gentle coda again evoking flamenco guitars along with distant church bells.

Book 2

 Rondeña (D major), after the Andalusian town of Ronda.
 Almería (G major), relating to the Andalusian seaport of Almería, is loosely based on tarantas, a flamenco form characteristic of the region of Almería.
 Triana (F minor), after the Gypsy quarter of Seville.

Book 3
 El Albaicín (B minor and B major) after the Albaicín, district of Granada.
 El Polo (F minor) after the Polo (flamenco palo) .
 Lavapiés (D major), after the district of Madrid.

Book 4
 Málaga (B minor and B major)
 Jerez (A minor – arguably E Phrygian – and E major)
 Eritaña (E major)

Premiere performance
The twelve pieces were first performed by the French pianist Blanche Selva, but each book was premiered in a different place and on a different date. Three of the performances were in Paris, the other being in a small town in the south of France.
 Book I: May 9, 1906, Salle Pleyel, Paris
 Book II: September 11, 1907, Saint-Jean-de-Luz
 Book III: January 2, 1908, Palace of Princess de Polignac, Paris
 Book IV: February 9, 1909, Société Nationale de Musique, Paris.

Recordings
Among notable early recordings, pieces from Iberia were recorded by Arthur Rubinstein. Iberia was first recorded in its entirety by Alicia de Larrocha in 1958-9 (Hispavox / Erato DUE 20236/37, [EMI 64504?]). She recorded it twice more, in 1972 (London 448191 and 433926), and 1989 (London 417887). The suite was also recorded by Luis Fernando Pérez, which has been highly acclaimed and earned him the Albéniz Medal. It has also been recorded by Claudio Arrau (Books 1 and 2 only). Gustavo Díaz-Jerez, whose 2009 CD recording also won him the 2010 Albéniz Medal, is  the first pianist to record Iberia in DVD and High Definition Video.  Other pianists that have audio recordings of Iberia include Miguel Baselga, Ricardo Requejo, Michel Block, Guillermo González (according to his own critical edition of the score), Marc-André Hamelin, Yvonne Loriod, Marek Jablonski, Artur Pizarro, Jean-François Heisser, Esteban Sánchez, and Ángel Sanzo, among many others.

Arrangements

Enrique Fernández Arbós and Carlos Surinach each arranged pieces from Iberia for full orchestra. There is an orchestral arrangement of the Fête-dieu à Seville by Leopold Stokowski, from the mid-1920s, which he recorded with the Philadelphia Orchestra in 1928.

More recently, Peter Breiner arranged the whole work for full orchestra. The composer Francisco Guerrero Marín, calling Iberia "the greatest Spanish work in the last hundred years", also made an arrangement of six pieces before his death in 1997. A version for three guitars was made by Christophe Dejour and recorded by Trio Campanella. A two-guitar overdubbing version has been released by French guitarist Jean-Marc Zvellenreuther.

An invitation to Ravel to orchestrate six pieces from Iberia was the genesis of that composer's Boléro.

References

External links
 

Spanish compositions for solo piano
Suites by Isaac Albéniz
1909 compositions
Orchestral suites